SQ2 may refer to:

Backcountry Super Cubs Mackey SQ2, an American amateur-built aircraft design
SQ2, a galactic quadrant in the Milky Way
SQ2, mixtape by Lil Wayne
Space Quest II, a video game
Microsoft SQ2, a system on a chip